A flying junction or flyover is a railway junction at which one or more diverging or converging tracks in a multiple-track route cross other tracks on the route by bridge to avoid conflict with other train movements. A more technical term is "grade-separated junction". A burrowing junction or dive-under occurs where the diverging line passes below the main line.

The alternative to grade separation is a level junction or flat junction, where tracks cross at grade, and conflicting routes must be protected by interlocked signals.

Complexity

Simple flying junctions may have a single track pass over or under other tracks to avoid conflict, while complex flying junctions may have an elaborate infrastructure to allow multiple routings without trains coming into conflict, in the manner of a highway stack interchange.

Flying junction without crossings
Where two lines each of two tracks merge with a flying junction, they can become a four-track railway together, the tracks paired by direction. This happens regularly in the Netherlands (see Examples below).

High-speed rail
Nearly all junctions with high-speed railways are grade-separated.

The LGV network has four grade-separated high-speed triangles: Fretin (near Lille), Coubert (southeast Paris), Claye-Souilly (northeast Paris) and Angles (Avignon).  A fifth, Vémars (northeast Paris), is grade-separated except for a single-track link on the least-used side, linking Paris Gare du Nord and Paris CDG airport.

Examples 
Australia
 Bowen Hills railway station in Brisbane
 Burnley railway station in Melbourne
 Camberwell railway station in Melbourne
 Sydney Central Station
 Glenfield railway station, Sydney
 Strathfield railway station
 Sandgate Flyover, Newcastle – main line flies over coal branch line
 Goodwood railway station in Adelaide
 Bayswater railway station in Perth

Canada

 Columbia station in New Westminster, BC – Expo Line branches for King George (top) and Production Way–University (bottom)
 Bridgeport station in Richmond, BC – Canada Line branches for YVR–Airport and Richmond–Brighouse

Denmark
 Hvidovre, Copenhagen
 Junction of M1 and M2 lines on the Copenhagen Metro
 Lunderskov
 Roskilde, south of 
 Sydhavnen, Copenhagen
 Vigerslev, Copenhagen

Finland
 Railway junction of two main lines at Kytömaa, Kerava

France (LGV Triangles)
 Triangle de Fretin, Lille, connecting Paris, Brussels and London
 Triangle de Coubert, Paris
 Triangle des Angles, Avignon, with two parallel  viaducts
 Triangle de Claye-Souilly, Paris, partial four-way junction
 Triangle de Vémars, Paris
Germany

Bruchsal Rollenberg junction
Hong Kong

 Where Airport Express and Tung Chung line diverge from each other at Tai Ho Wan
 Tseung Kwan O line to the east of Tseung Kwan O station
Netherlands

There are between 25 and about 40 flying junctions on Dutch railways, depending on how more complex examples are counted.
 Near Harmelen. Before conversion to a flying junction, this was the site of the Harmelen train disaster.
 At Breukelen railway station
 At Lage Zwaluwe railway station
Flying junctions where the merged lines become a four track railway:
 Near Den Haag Laan van NOI railway station
 North of Leiden where lines from Haarlem and Schiphol merge
 At Boxtel railway station where lines from 's-Hertogenbosch and Tilburg merge
 West of Gouda where lines from Rotterdam and The Hague merge
More complex flying junctions, with tracks from four directions joining:
 Around Amsterdam Sloterdijk railway station
 Around Duivendrecht railway station
 Northwest exit of Utrecht Centraal railway station
 West and northwest exit of Rotterdam Centraal railway station
 At both sides of Weesp railway station (see diagram at right)

Norway
 Lillestrøm
 Lysaker
 Sandvika, east of and west of 

Sweden
 Flemingsberg
 Järna, north of 
 Järna, south of 
 Lund
 Hyllie
 Myrbacken
 Lernacken
 Södertälje hamn
 Södertälje syd
 Tomteboda

Taiwan
 Start of Shalun line, south of Zhongzhou railway station

United Kingdom
  Pelaw Junction where both the Tyne and Wear Metro green line to  South Hylton joins the Durham Coast Line and yellow line continues to  South Shields – both diverging on the bridge itself
 Springhead Junction on the North Kent Line
 Southfleet Junction on the HS1
 Norton Bridge Junction near Stone, Staffordshire
 Hamilton Square underground station, Birkenhead, on Merseyrail
 Aynho Junction in Aynho, Northamptonshire
 Worting Junction near Basingstoke, Hampshire (the flyover is called Battledown Flyover)
 Cogload Junction near Taunton
 Weaver Junction near Dutton, Cheshire
 Shortlands Junction in south London
 Northwest of Harrow-on-the-Hill, in the north London suburbs
 Hitchin flyover, Hertfordshire.
 Werrington Junction dive-under, under construction north of Peterborough (north of Hitchin)
 Reading West Junction
 Bleach Green Viaducts & Junction, Whiteabbey, Northern Ireland

United States

 Northeast U.S. (Amtrak)
 Along the New York–Washington section of the Northeast Corridor, and on the Philadelphia–Harrisburg section of the Keystone Corridor. Both converge at Zoo Junction near 30th Street Station in Philadelphia.  All were built by the former Pennsylvania Railroad and are now maintained by Amtrak.
 Boston, Massachusetts area
 An abandoned underground junction on the Tremont Street subway approaching the Pleasant Street incline
 The B branch splits off from the C and D branches of the MBTA Green Line via an underground flying junction just west of Kenmore station.
 The Union Square spur splits off from the Green Line Extension of the MBTA Green Line via an aerial flying junction on the Red Bridge viaduct in the Inner Belt area of Somerville, Massachusetts just north of Lechmere station in Cambridge. Lead tracks to the GLX maintenance facility also split off from the junction slightly further west.
 The two southern branches of the MBTA Red Line in Boston split via a flying junction just north of JFK/UMass station.  In addition, lead tracks to Cabot Yard maintenance facilities branch off from the junction.
 Chicago, Illinois
 On the Chicago "L", where Orange Line trains diverge from Green Line trains north of 18th Street, as well as underground where a non-revenue flying junction separates Red Line trains heading to 95th from those heading to the South Side main line, currently used to send some rush-period Red Line trains to Ashland/63rd.
The Milwaukee–Dearborn subway (now part of the Blue Line) was constructed to have a flying junction where turning between Lake Street and Milwaukee Avenue at Canal Street. The outbound tunnel and its stub, designed to continue west under Lake Street, was bored at less depth than the inbound tunnel and its Lake Street stub, in order to allow future Lake Street trains (now part of the Green and (Pink Lines) to run under or over the opposing Milwaukee Avenue trains while entering or exiting the shared portion of the Lake Street tunnels. Plans in 1939 called for tunnels to replace the elevated Lake Street tracks east of approximately Racine Avenue. By 1962, the planned Lake Street tunnels to/from Racine Avenue would have curved south to Randolph Street and bypassed the Milwaukee-Lake-Dearborn tunnel entirely.
 Another flying junction is under construction immediately north of Belmont/Sheffield to increase capacity on the Red Line, Brown Line, and Purple Line Express.
 Denver, Colorado
 On the Regional Transportation District in Denver between the Southeast Corridor and the I-225 Corridor: the Southeast Corridor is on the west side of I-25 and the I-225 Corridor is in the median of I-225. The grade separations of the junction are woven into the grade separations of the interchange between the two highways.
 New York, New York
 On the New York City Subway there is an above-ground example at Hammel's Wye on the IND Rockaway Line, as well as numerous below-ground examples across the network
 Connecting Metro-North Railroad's New Haven Line and Harlem Line, near Wakefield station in the Bronx
 Philadelphia, Pennsylvania
 Amtrak's Zoo Junction, where the Northeast Corridor meets the Keystone Corridor and sorts into 30th Street Station's lower and upper level platforms. Also known as Zoo Interlocking, the name comes from the Philadelphia Zoo, which is located in the crescent shaped pocket between the junction and the river.
 On SEPTA's Cynwyd Line, diverging from the Keystone Corridor west of 52nd Street.
 On SEPTA Airport Line, diverging from the Northeast Corridor south of Penn Medicine
 On SEPTA's subway–surface trolley lines, where the Route 10 diverges from Routes 11/13/34/36 west of 33rd Street.
 On SEPTA's Broad Street subway, where Broad-Ridge Spur trains diverge at Fairmount. There are also provisions for flying junctions north of Erie for the Roosevelt Boulevard Subway, and north of Olney for an extension on North Broad Street; both are maintained as layup tracks.
San Francisco Bay Area, California
 The Oakland Wye, where all of Bay Area Rapid Transit's mainline operations converge near downtown Oakland
 On the Market Street subway in San Francisco where the J Church and N Judah lines join the main line of the subway. The subway portal is east of the intersection of Church Street and Duboce Avenue in the Duboce Triangle neighborhood, immediately north of a Safeway supermarket and south of the San Francisco branch of the United States Mint.
 Washington, District of Columbia
 All main-line connections on the Washington Metro – adjacent to the Pepco power plant on Benning Road (near the Stadium-Armory station) is a large three-track structure with a turnback pocket where the Blue, Silver and Orange Lines meet.  This would have been part of the Oklahoma Avenue station, had it been built.  South of the King Street station in Alexandria is a series of tunnels where the Blue and Yellow Lines meet.  There are also flying junctions near three underground rail stations:  Rosslyn (Blue, Silver, and Orange Lines), L'Enfant Plaza (Green and Yellow lines), and the Pentagon (Blue and Yellow lines).

See also
Double junction
Interchange (road)

Notes

References

External links 

 WikiMapia link – aerial photo of Fretin triangle (mentioned above)
 Photo link – flying junction on Pennsylvania Railroad north of 30th Street Station, Philadelphia, Pennsylvania, United States
 Photo link – simpler flying junction at terminus of Market–Frankford transit line, 69th Street Station, Philadelphia, Pennsylvania, United States

Rail junction types
Railway bridges